World Turtle Day is an annual observance held every May 23rd. It began in 2000 and is sponsored by American Tortoise Rescue. The day was created as a yearly observance to help people celebrate and protect turtles and tortoises and their disappearing habitats, as well as to encourage human action to help them survive and thrive. A study on the effects of biodiversity awareness days listed World Turtle Day as an example of how they increase the internet search traffic on the protected species. 

World Turtle Day is promoted by dressing up as turtles, wearing green summer dresses, saving turtles caught on highways, research activities, and adopting turtles or tortoises from rehabilitation centers. American Tortoise Rescue provides Turtle Day lesson plans and craft projects, to encourage teaching about turtles in classrooms.

The term "World Turtle Day" is trademarked by Susan Tellem of Malibu, California.

References

External links

American Tortoise Rescue

May observances
Turtles in popular culture
Turtle conservation
Recurring events established in 1990